The current Graham County Courthouse is a courthouse located at 800 W. Main St. in Safford, Arizona that is listed on the National Register of Historic Places. It is a two-story red brick building above a concrete foundation that includes a raised basement.

It is the fifth courthouse of the county, following one in Safford during 1881–83, two in Solomonville, Arizona during 1883–1915, and the 1901 Riggs building at Main and Central in Safford during 1915–16.  After Arizona achieved statehood in 1912, Safford was chosen as the location for Graham's county seat in a 1915 election, moving it four miles west from Solomonville, the county seat since 1883.  A $50,000 bond was authorized to finance construction of a courthouse with courtrooms, offices, and jail.  The Classic Revival/Neo-Classic style courthouse was built in 1916.  Its construction cost $44,404.

J. A. McAllister, a justice in the Arizona Supreme Court, and Jesse A. Udall, a chief justice of the Arizona Supreme Court, began their careers here.

In 1982, the interior public areas retained the original wooden moldings, interior doors, door trim, and wainscoting, and wooden balustrade and newel post of the main staircase.

It was added to the National Register of Historic Places in 1982.

Although the building is historic, it still serves as location of Graham County's Superior Court, in 2016.

References

County courthouses in Arizona
Safford, Arizona
Buildings and structures in Graham County, Arizona
Courthouses on the National Register of Historic Places in Arizona
Government buildings completed in 1916
1916 establishments in Arizona
Neoclassical architecture in Arizona
National Register of Historic Places in Graham County, Arizona